Artificial sun may refer to:

Artificial Sun (Russian label), a Russian record label
Artificial sunlight
Laser Mégajoule, near Bordeaux, France
National Ignition Facility, at the Lawrence Livermore National Laboratory in Livermore, California
Experimental Advanced Superconducting Tokamak, at the Hefei Institutes of Physical Science in Hefei, China
Znamya (space mirror), an orbital space mirror
Fusion power
Tanning booth